The Maddox Brothers and Rose – Vol. 1; America’s Most Colorful Hillbilly Band, Their Original Recordings 1946-1951 is a re-issue of recordings by Maddox Brothers and Rose during the years 1946 through 1951.

Track listing
"George's Playhouse Boogie"  – 2:45
"Midnight Train"  – 3:05
"Shimmy Shakin' Daddy"  – 2:11
"Careless Driver"  – 2:49
"Move It On Over" (Hank Williams) – 2:46
"Whoa Sailor" (Hank Thompson) – 2:36
"Milk Cow Blues" (Kokomo Arnold) – 3:10
"Mean and Wicked Boogie"  – 2:39
"Brown Eyes" (A.P. Carter) – 2:58
"Honky Tonkin'" (Hank Williams) – 2:27
"Time Nor Tide"  – 3:02
"New Mule Skinner Blues"† (George Vaughn, Jimmie Rodgers) – 2:10
"Philadelphia Lawyer" (Woody Guthrie) – 3:15
"Sally Let Your Bangs Hang Down"  – 2:18
"When I Lay My Burden Down"  – 2:16
"Hangover Blues"  – 2:37
"Water Baby Boogie"  – 2:09
"Dark as a Dungeon"  – 2:23
"Mule Train"  – 2:56
"Oklahoma Sweetheart Sally Ann"  – 2:15
"Faded Love"  – 2:41
"New Step It Up and Go"  – 2:28
"(Pay Me) Alimony"  – 2:12
"I Wish I Was a Single Girl Again" – 2:13
"Your Love Light Never Shone"  – 2:02
"Meanest Man in Town"  – 2:33
"I Want to Live and Love"  – 2:05
† Track 12 is actually "I Want to Live and Love", although a different version than track 27.

Personnel
Rose Maddox - vocals
Gene Breeden, Jimmy Winkle, Ray Nichols - lead guitar
Henry Maddox - mandolin, lead guitar (after 1949)
Cal Maddox - rhythm guitar, harmonica, vocals
Fred Maddox - bass
Don Maddox - fiddle
Cliff Maddox - mandolin (until 1949)
Bud Maddox - steel guitar
Fred Maddox - lead vocals on "Mean and Wicked Boogie" and "Gonna Lay My Burden Down"

References

Maddox Brothers and Rose albums
1976 compilation albums